There are at least 40 named and hundreds of unnamed glaciers  in Denali National Park and Preserve.

List of glaciers
 Brooks Glacier
 Buckskin Glacier
 Caldwell Glacier
 Cantwell Glacier
 Chedotlothna Glacier
 Cul-de-sac Glacier
 Dall Glacier
 Eldridge Glacier
 Fleischmann Glacier
 Foraker Glacier
 Herron Glacier
 Kahiltna Glacier
 Kanikula Glacier ((also the Southeast, East and Northeast Forks of Kahiltna Glacier near its head))
 Lacuna Glacier
 Muldrow Glacier
 Peters Glacier
 Polychrome Glaciers ((five glaciers in neighboring valleys))
 Ruth Glacier ((also the West, Northwest and Northeast Forks of Ruth Glacier near its head))
 Shadows Glacier
 Shelf Glacier
 Straightaway Glacier
 Sunrise Glacier
 Sunset Glacier
 Surprise Glacier
 Tatina Glacier
 Tokositna Glacier
 Traleika Glacier ((also the West Fork of Traleika Glacier))
 West Fork Glacier
 Yentna Glacier

See also
 Mountains and mountain ranges of Denali National Park and Preserve

References

Denali National Park and Preserve
Glaciers